Gyrineum gyrinum is a species of predatory sea snail, a marine gastropod mollusk in the family Cymatiidae.

Description

Distribution
This marine species occurs off Papua New Guinea.

References

 Liu, J.Y. [Ruiyu] (ed.). (2008). Checklist of marine biota of China seas. China Science Press. 1267 pp.

External links
 Linnaeus, C. (1758). Systema Naturae per regna tria naturae, secundum classes, ordines, genera, species, cum characteribus, differentiis, synonymis, locis. Editio decima, reformata [10th revised edition, vol. 1: 824 pp. Laurentius Salvius: Holmiae]
 Link D.H.F. (1807-1808). Beschreibung der Naturalien-Sammlung der Universität zu Rostock. Rostock: Adlers Erben
 Beu A.G. (1998). Résultats des Campagnes MUSORSTOM: 19. Indo-West Pacific Ranellidae, Bursidae and Personidae (Mollusca: Gastropoda), a monograph of the New Caledonian fauna and revisions of related taxa. Mémoires du Muséum National d'Histoire Naturelle. 178: 1-255

Cymatiidae
Gastropods described in 1758
Taxa named by Carl Linnaeus